UWM may stand for 
Universities:
University of Wisconsin–Milwaukee 
 University of Warmia and Mazury in Olsztyn, Poland
In computing:
Ultrix Window Manager
UDE Window Manager
Others
Ticker symbol for ProShares Ultra Russell2000 at NYSE Arca 
United World Mission
United Wholesale Mortgage